A Naked Twist in My Story is an acoustic remake of the Secondhand Serenade studio album A Twist in My Story, released February 19, 2008 on Glassnote. It was released on September 11, 2012 on iTunes and Amazon without any single to promote it, though some samples were released on Soundcloud. The remake featured all of the songs from A Twist in My Story rerecorded with keyboards, violin, and guitar, and without any drums, electric guitar, or bass. A new song "Belong To" was featured as a bonus track.

Track listing

2012 albums
Secondhand Serenade albums